Softball is a sport that is played in many schools and universities in India, however, the sport has not caught on at the professional level. Softball in India is governed by the Softball Association of India. Softball was introduced to India in 1944 when some local boys began playing the sport with American troops stationed at Jodhpur during the second world war.

The women's Softball team of India to make its debut in the 19th Asian games and it is approved by the Indian Olympic Association of India

References

External links
 Softball Association of India